Rainer is the German form of the Germanic name Raginheri (Scandinavian Ragnar), composed of the two elements ragin ("advice") and heri ("army").
Other variants of the name include Dutch Reinier, French Rainier, Spanish and Italian Raniero.

Notable people
Notable people with this name include:

Musicians
 Rainer Bloss (born 1946), German electronic musician
 Rainer Brüninghaus (born 1949), German jazz musician
 Rainer Nygård (born 1972), Finnish guitarist (Diablo)
 Rainer Ptacek (1951–1997), American guitarist

Nobility
 Archduke Rainer Ferdinand of Austria (1827–1913), Austrian prime minister
 Archduke Rainer Joseph of Austria (1783–1853), Austrian viceroy of the kingdom of Lombardy-Venetia
 Archduke Rainer of Austria (1895–1930), Austrian prince imperial
 Prince Rainer of Saxe-Coburg and Gotha (1900–1945), German prince

Sportspeople
 Rainer Adrion (born 1953), German footballer and manager
 Rainer Aigner (born 1967), German former footballer
 Rainer Åkerfelt (born 1934), Finnish sprint canoer
 Rainer Bonhof (born 1952), German footballer
 Rainer Eitzinger (born 1983), Austrian tennis player
 Rainer Forss (born 1930), Finnish footballer
 Rainer Nicot (born 1954), German footballer
 Rainer Ohlhauser (born 1941), German footballer
 Rainer Osselmann (born 1960), German water polo player
 Rainer Philipp (born 1950), German ice hockey player
 Rainer Schönfelder (born 1977), Austrian skier
 Rainer Schüttler (born 1976), German tennis player
 Rainer Torres (born 1980), Peruvian footballer
 Rainer Zobel (born 1948), German footballer

Other
 Rainer Arnold (born 1950), German politician
 Rainer Barzel (1924–2006), German politician
 Rainer Brüderle (born 1945), German politician
 Rainer Ludwig Claisen (1851–1930), German chemist
 Rainer Fetting (born 1949), German painter and sculptor
 Rainer von Fieandt (1890–1972), Finnish banker and politician
 Rainer Frimmel (born 1971), Austrian film director and photographer
 Rainer Froese (born 1950), German marine ecologist
 Rainer Lagemann (born 1959), German sculptor and photographer
 Rainer Langhans (June 1940), German writer and filmmaker
 Rainer Maria Latzke (born 1950), German artist
 Rainer Lemström (1931–2007), Finnish politician
 M. Rainer Lepsius (1928–2014), German sociologist
 Rainer Liedtke (1943–2012), German physician, scientist and entrepreneur
 Rainer Mahlamäki (born 1956), Finnish architect
 Rainer Masera (born 1944), Italian academic and economist
 Rainer Moormann (born 1950), German chemist and nuclear whistleblower
 Rainer Nõlvak (born 1966), Estonian entrepreneur and environmentalist
 Rainer Offergeld (born 1937), German politician
 Rainer Ortleb (born 1944), German academic and politician
 Rainer Maria Rilke (1875–1926), Bohemian-Austrian poet and novelist
 Rainer Sarnet (born 1969), Estonian film director
 Rainer Vakra (born 1981), Estonian politician
 Raniero Vanni d'Archirafi (born 1931), Italian diplomat
 Rainer Weiss (born 1932), American physicist
 Rainer Werner Fassbinder (1945–1982), German film director
 Rainer Zitelmann (born 1957), German historian

See also
 Rainer (surname)
 Rainer (disambiguation)
 Rainier (name)
 Raynor (surname)
 Reina (given name)

References

German masculine given names
Estonian masculine given names
Finnish masculine given names